This is a list of all sumo wrestlers who have reached the sport's highest rank of yokozuna. It was not recorded on the banzuke until 1890 and was not officially recognised as sumo's highest rank until 1909. Until then, yokozuna was merely a licence given to certain ōzeki to perform the dohyō-iri ceremony. It was not always the strongest ōzeki but those with the most influential patrons who were chosen.

The first list of yokozuna (with 17 names in total) was compiled by the 12th yokozuna Jinmaku Kyūgorō in 1900 but was not regarded as official until 1926 when it was published by the newly formed Japan Sumo Association and updated to 31 names. Since that time, 42 more yokozuna have been promoted. The Sumo Association have overseen all promotions since Chiyonoyama's in 1951. Two consecutive tournament championships or an "equivalent performance" at ōzeki level are the minimum requirement for promotion to yokozuna in modern sumo.

The longest serving yokozuna ever was Hakuhō, who was promoted in 2007 and retired in 2021.

The number of top division championships won by each yokozuna is also listed.  Those listed for yokozuna active before the summer tournament of 1909 are historically conferred from the win–loss records of the time as no system of championships existed up to this time.

List

Timeline

See also
List of past sumo wrestlers
List of sumo tournament top division champions
List of ōzeki
List of sekiwake
List of komusubi

Notes

External links
Yokozuna list at the Japanese Sumo Association (English) (Japanese)

Lists of Japanese sportspeople
Lists of sportspeople
 
Lists of sumo wrestlers